Helix is an American science fiction horror drama television series that aired on Syfy from January 10, 2014, to April 10, 2015. The series followed a team of scientists from the Centers for Disease Control and Prevention (CDC) who traveled to a research facility in the Arctic to investigate a potential outbreak of disease. While there, they find themselves stuck in a life-or-death situation that could decide the future of mankind. The executive producers of Helix were Ronald D. Moore, Lynda Obst, Steven Maeda, and Cameron Porsandeh, with Maeda serving as day-to-day showrunner. On April 29, 2015, Syfy announced that the show was canceled after two seasons.

Plot

Season 1
Researchers from the CDC, led by Dr. Alan Farragut and Dr. Sarah Jordan investigate a viral outbreak at an Arctic bioresearch station, only to discover that it has disastrous and wider implications for the entire world. Proscribed genetic engineering research is being done by the Ilaria Corporation, the company running the research station, most interested in preventing exposure of their activities, rather than simply resolving the outbreak. Attempts at quarantine result in mutiny and attempted escape, and communication with the outside is mysteriously cut off. It is unclear at first whether the goal is to develop a bioweapon or to transform humans in some way. It is discovered that there are two variants of the virus: the first, Narvik-A, is fatal with no cure; those infected with the second virus, Narvik-B, become dangerous, violent, zombie-like vectors, spreading the infection to others, with a small percentage eventually regaining some normality if treated, as it seems several characters have already been infected and cured. Those cured seem to have the ability to control the infected. The outbreak is revealed to have been a cover story to recruit Julia Walker as an unwitting test subject by deceiving the CDC personnel into creating an anti-viral "cure", to benefit the Ilaria Corporation's objectives.

After becoming infected, Julia is cured by the station director, Hiroshi Hatake, who reveals he is her father, quasi-immortal and over 500 years old, as indicated by his bright silver eyes. He had created the Vector virus as a means to activate dormant genes within Julia to give her a similar variation of immortality. Ilaria, which is run by a similar group of immortals, wants the virus in order to exert control over the world. Ilaria's Chief Operating Officer, Constance Sutton, arrives with a mercenary army, and despite a protracted resistance effort by the CDC and base personnel, butchers most of the staff before abducting Julia. A cliffhanger, set almost eight months after the pilot episode (on Day 235), shows Alan meeting with his brother Peter somewhere in France, following a massive outbreak of the virus, to plan a border crossing. Alan is apparently oblivious to the fact that his brother is actively working with Ilaria and that Julia is an active member of Ilaria's immortal Board of Directors.

Season 2
Set once more in a remote, isolated place, this time the island of St. Germain, inhabited by members of a religious community going back several generations, the second season takes place approximately fifteen months after the events of the first season, with regular sequences showing events taking place an additional thirty years later on the same island. Alan, who has been interrogating and then killing immortals in his search to rescue Julia, has been discredited by the CDC. Peter leads the three-member team investigating a new outbreak on the island. In the future, Julia is on a quest of her own.

Cast

Principal

 Billy Campbell as Dr. Alan Farragut
 Hiroyuki Sanada as Dr. Hiroshi Hatake (main season 1; recurring season 2)
 Kyra Zagorsky as Dr. Julia Walker
 Mark Ghanimé as Major Sergio Balleseros 
 Matt Long as Dr. Kyle Sommer (season 2)

Recurring

 Seasons 1–2
 Jordan Hayes as Dr. Sarah Jordan
 Neil Napier as Dr. Peter Farragut 
 Meegwun Fairbrother as Daniel Aerov/Miksa and Tulok
 Luciana Carro as Anana (credit only in season 2)
 Amber Goldfarb as Jaye and as Jane Walker
 Catherine Lemieux as Dr. Doreen Boyle

 Season 1
 Jeri Ryan as Constance Sutton
 Robert Naylor as Spencer Sutton / The Scythe
 Julian Casey as Dr. Victor Adrian
 Patrick Baby as Dr. Philippe Duchamp
 Chimwemwe Miller as Dr. Joel Haven
 Miranda Handford as Dr. Rae Van Eigem
 Leni Parker as Dr. Tracey
 Vitali Makarov as Dr. Dmitri Marin
 Alain Goulem as Dr. Bryce
 Tamara Brown as Dr. Sulemani
 Eric Davis as Dr. Graf
 Alexandra Ordolis as Blake
 Helen Koya as Thea / Willa
 Christian Jadah as Lt. Klein
 Anders Yates as Gunnar

 Season 2
 Steven Weber as Brother Michael
 Alison Louder as Sister Amy
 Severn Thompson as Sister Anne
 Clare Coulter as Sister Agnes
 Sean Tucker as Landry
 Jim Thorburn as Caleb
 Sarah Booth as Olivia
 Cameron Brodeur as Soren
 Kayla DiVenere as Lizzie
 Patricia Summersett as Lt. Commander Winger
 Julian Bailey as Lt. Humphries
 Matthew Kabwe as Maxwell
 Cristina Rosato as Leila Weisner

Development
The series pitch idea was developed by Cameron Porsandeh, who then submitted it to Sony Pictures, where Lynda Obst revised the idea along with Porsandeh. Sony then asked if there was a major science fiction television writer he would like attached as executive producer, and he suggested Ronald D. Moore, who joined the production team and pitched several new major concepts. The pilot script was written by Porsandeh, and while Moore pitched several key ideas he did not write the script itself.

As Porsandeh explained:

So I took a stab at it and we sent it over to Sony [Pictures Television] and Lynda Obst, she takes a real interest in science, she did Contact and really sort of prides herself on the subject, and she saw something in it. So I developed it over at Sony for probably about six months. Then they said "if you could work with anyone on this project, who would you want to do it with?" And I said, "Ron Moore" sort of like it's a fantasy, sort of like "who would you want to date if you could date anyone," and I threw his name out the way you would throw a movie star's name out. They sent it over to him and he was interested so he got on board. Then together we came up with an overarching mythology that would extend over the course of the entire series, then he and I together pitched it to Syfy.

Porsandeh stated that a major feature of the series is that each episode represents the events of a single day within the story: thus the entire thirteen episode first season takes place in under two weeks of in-universe time.

According to Porsandeh, Helix did not make use of flashback scenes to give details about character backstories, the way the science fiction series Lost did. Instead, a key point is that viral infection at times made characters feverish and hallucinate (which is a real-life symptom of several infections). Thus certain characters experienced hallucinations, i.e. reliving particularly traumatic past events. The distinction Porsandeh pointed out is that a flashback is presented as objectively true, while the hallucination scenes in Helix are presented from the characters' feverish hallucinatory states, and thus their unreliable narration will contain several errors which do not match events as they actually occurred.

Episodes

Season 1 (2014)

Season 2 (2015)

Home media 
The first season of Helix was released in DVD and Blu-ray Disc formats on June 30, 2014, for Region 2 and July 1, 2014, for Region 1. The Blu-ray Disc features two exclusives: Writing the Tension, an inside look at the process of writing a serialized thriller, and Fabricating the Plague, state-of-the-art effects techniques used in conception of the virus' appearance in stages to creating the right amount of gore for the plague. Both media formats contain commentary on the pilot episode with Billy Campbell and Cameron Porsandeh, commentary on "Dans L'Ombre" with Campbell and Steven Maeda, four featurettes, deleted scenes, and outtakes.

The series is currently available on Hulu

Reception
Helix received generally positive reviews from critics. The first season holds a 79% critical approval on Rotten Tomatoes and 67% on Metacritic, while the second season has not been reviewed enough on either platform for a consensus. The critical consensus for season one described the show as "effectively creepy and oozing with chills" and that the show "unexpectedly digs deep into its world and its characters, with a suspenseful plot that continues to pique interest as it advances." Gail Pennington, for St. Louis Post-Dispatch, said of the first season: "you like this kind of thing or you don't, and I don't, particularly, but Helix is very involving." Reviewing the first season for The New York Times, Neil Genzlinger praised the acting. He felt that cast was "led admirably" by Billy Campbell as Dr. Alan Farragut, saying "Mr. Campbell is one of the busiest actors around" and despite the fact that "an abundance of work can sometimes lead to performances that feel phoned in", it doesn't feel that way here.

See also
 Biological warfare in popular culture
 Genetic engineering in science fiction
 Immortality in science fiction
 PEPCK-Cmus mouse

Notes

References

External links
 
 
 Official Helix Showcase Canada website

2014 American television series debuts
2015 American television series endings
2010s American science fiction television series
English-language television shows
Serial drama television series
Syfy original programming
Television series by Sony Pictures Television
Television series about viral outbreaks
Television shows filmed in Montreal
Television shows set in Atlanta
Television shows set in the Arctic
Zombies in television
2010s American drama television series
2010s American horror television series
Centers for Disease Control and Prevention in fiction
Television series about genetic engineering
Transhumanism in television series
Biological weapons in popular culture
Science fiction horror
Psychological horror